The 2021 XPEL 375 was an IndyCar motor race held on May 2, 2021 at the Texas Motor Speedway. It was the fourth round of the 2021 IndyCar Series. Pato O'Ward of Arrow McLaren SP captured the lead late in the race to score his first career IndyCar series victory.

Entrants

Qualifying 
No qualifying session took place for the race, as officials were forced to cancel the session due to weather delays. As a result, qualifying results and the starting lineup for the race were determined based on the driver standings after the previous race, the Genesys 300. As the points leader, Scott Dixon was awarded pole position.

Qualifying classification

Race

Race classification

Championship standings after the race 

Drivers' Championship standings

Engine manufacturer standings

 Note: Only the top five positions are included.

References 
Notes

Citations

External links 

XPEL 375